Puar may refer to:
 Pawar, Maratha rulers of Dhar State and Dewas State.
 Pu'ar, a character in Dragon Ball

People with the name
 Hemendra Singh Rao Pawar, present titular Maharaja of Dhar State
 Tukojirao III (Tukoji Rao III Puar of Dewas Sr.)
 Shahoji II (Vikramsinh Rao I Puar of Dewas Sr.)
 Krishnajirao III (Krishnaji Rao III Puar of Dewas Sr.)
 Tukojirao IV (Tukoji Rao IV Puar of Dewas Sr.)
 Vikram Singh Rao II Puar (Vikram Singh Rao II Puar of Dewas Sr.)
 Mrunalini Devi Puar (1931–2015), Indian educator, Maharani of Dhar State (wife of HH Maharaja Anand Rao IV Puar of Dhar)
 Jasbir Puar, US-based queer theorist

See also
Puer, a disambiguation page
Dhar State, ruled by the Puar (Pawar) dynasty of the Marathas
Dewas State, Junior and Senior states ruled by the Puar (Pawar) dynasty of the Marathas
Maratha Empire
List of Maratha dynasties and states